Baluchabad-e Mashu (also Romanized as Balūchābād-e Mashū) is a village in Fenderesk-e Jonubi Rural District, Fenderesk District, Ramian County, Golestan Province, Iran. At the 2006 census, its population was 1,025, in 219 families.

References 

Populated places in Ramian County